Ernest Blakelock Thubron, also known as Émile Thubron (15 July 1861) was an Anglo-French motorboat racer and an olympic champion. He was born in The Boldons, United Kingdom. He died in Tokomaru, New Zealand on 22 May 1927

He won the second running of the Harmsworth Trophy for motor powered boats in 1904 in Trefle-à-quatre. In 1898, Thubron was a Managing Owner of Boulac Engine Works, Cairo and in 1906 he was still working as a boat constructor in Egypt.

He competed with his boat Camille in Class A (the open class) at the 1908 Summer Olympics in London, where he won a gold medal. He finished the forty nautical miles in 2:26:53, and Camille was the only boat to finish that race.

He retired in New Zealand. His son was a Brigadier by the name Gerald Thubron OBE and his grandson Colin Thubron, a writer.

References

External links
Emile Thubron's profile at Sports Reference.com

French motorboat racers
Motorboat racers at the 1908 Summer Olympics
Olympic motorboat racers of France
Olympic gold medalists for France
1861 births
1927 deaths
Medalists at the 1908 Summer Olympics